Eduardo Rosales Gallinas (4 November 1836 – 13 September 1873) was a Spanish painter. He was an adherent of the Italian-based art movement known as "Purismo" and specialized in historical scenes.

Biography 
He was born in Madrid. The second son of a minor official, he began his education in a private school operated by the Escolapios. He was orphaned as a teenager and enrolled in the Real Academia de Bellas Artes de San Fernando, where he studied under Federico de Madrazo in 1851.

Rosales accompanied some friends to Rome in 1857, without a fellowship or other financial support, until he received a special stipend from the government to continue his studies in 1861. He joined a group of Spanish painters who gathered in the Antico Caffè Greco, which included José Casado del Alisal, Dióscoro Puebla and Marià Fortuny. There he began to associate with followers of the Nazarene movement, but soon abandoned his interest in them and produced his first important work "Tobías y el angel". 

However, he continued to be interested in developing a more realistic style, which was achieved in his best known work "Doña Isabel la Católica dictando su testamento". He took it to the International Exposition (1867) in Paris and later returned to Rome, where he sent a telegram to his friends Martín Rico and Raimundo de Madrazo telling them that the painting had been an outstanding success, taking the First Gold Medal for work by a foreigner. He was also named a Chevalier in the Legion d'Honneur.

Final years
He married his cousin Maximina in 1868. They had two children, one of whom, Eloisa, died in infancy and was memorialized in his painting "Primeros pasos" (First Steps). Rosales was in poor health himself, having had tuberculosis for many years, and made frequent visits to Panticosa in the Pyrenees, where the water was famous for its curative properties. In 1869, he left Rome for good and opened a studio in Madrid. The harsh criticism he received for his work "La Muerte de Lucrecia" (1871) left him discouraged and he never painted another large-scale canvas.

The following year, hoping to find a climate that would more amenable to his health, he moved to Murcia. Upon the declaration of the First Spanish Republic, he was offered positions at the Museo del Prado, which he rejected, and at the new , which he accepted but never filled, due to his worsening condition. He died shortly thereafter, in Madrid.

In 1922, Madrid honored him with a memorial statue, sculpted by Mateo Inurria and placed on a street named after him, the Paseo del Pintor Rosales.

Other selected paintings

References

Further reading
 Juan Chacón Enríquez, Eduardo Rosales, Madrid, Blass, 1926.
 Bernardino de Pantorba, Eduardo Rosales, ensayo biográfico y crítico, Madrid, Chulilla y Angel, 1937.
 Juan Antonio López Delgado, Un tiempo juvenil del pintor Rosales: 1856–1857, Murcia, 2003, .
 Juan Antonio López Delgado, Eduardo Rosales en Murcia, Murcia, 1999, .
 José Luis Díez y otros,  Eduardo Rosales. Dibujos. Catálogo razonado, Santander, Fundación Marcelino Botín, 2007, .

External links 

 Eduardo Rosales, pintor de historia (Website devoted to Rosales)
 Scholarly articles in English about Eduardo Rosales both in web and PDF @ the Spanish Old Masters Gallery
 Arcadja Auctions: Drawings and other smaller works by Rosales.

1836 births
1873 deaths
19th-century Spanish painters
Spanish male painters
Artists from Madrid
Orientalist painters
Real Academia de Bellas Artes de San Fernando alumni
19th-century Spanish male artists